was a feudal domain under the Tokugawa shogunate of Edo period Japan, located in Hitachi Province (modern-day Ibaraki Prefecture), Japan. It was centered on Tsuchiura Castle in what is now the city of Tsuchiura, Ibaraki.  It was ruled for much of its history by the Tsuchiya clan.

History
During the Sengoku period, the area around Tsuchiura was controlled by the Oda clan, who were later destroyed by the Yūki clan. After the Battle of Sekigahara, and the establishment of the Tokugawa shogunate, the Yūki were relocated to Fukui Domain in Echizen Province and a portion of their vacated domain was given to Matsudaira Nobukazu as a reward for his rear-guard action in the Battle of Sekigahara. His son, Matsudaira Nobuyoshi, laid out the foundations of the castle town and built a number of gates on the Mito Kaidō highway linking Edo with Mito.

However, the Matsudaira were transferred to Takasaki Domain in Kōzuke Province and were replaced by Nishio Tadanaga, who received Tsuchiura as a reward of his services in the Siege of Osaka. His son, Nishio Tadateru, was transferred to Tanaka Domain in Suruga Province.

In 1649, Kutsuki Tanetsuna became daimyō, and was followed by his son Kutsuki Tanemasa until the clan was transferred to Fukuchiyama Domain in Tanba Province.
 
Tsuchiya Kazunao, a wakadoshiyori under Tokugawa Iemitsu received Tsuchiura next. He later became a rōjū. He was followed by his son, Tsuchiya Masanao, who was subsequently transferred to Tanaka Domain in Suruga Province.
The domain was then awarded to Matsudaira Nobuoki,  the 5th son of Matsudaira Nobutsuna, who held the post for only five years before being appointed Osaka jōdai.

Tsuchiura was then returned to Tsuchiya Kazunao, who had served as rōjū during the tenure of four shōguns, during which time his revenues had increased to 95,000koku. The Tsuchiya ruled Tsuchiura for the next ten generations until the Meiji Restoration. The final daimyō, Tsuchiya Shigenao, was adopted into the clan from the Mito Tokugawa clan, and was a younger brother of the last shōgun, Tokugawa Yoshinobu.

The domain had a total population of 12933 people in 2918 households per a census in 1741; however, in a census of 1834, the castle town of Shimodate had a population of only 1637 people in 364 households.

Holdings at the end of the Edo period
As with most domains in the han system, Tsuchiura Domain consisted of several discontinuous territories calculated to provide the assigned kokudaka, based on periodic cadastral surveys and projected agricultural yields. This was especially the case with Tsuchiura Domain, whose holdings were scattered in many locations.

Hitachi Province
8 villages in Ibaraki District
47 villages in Niihari District
8 villages in Shida District
53 villages in Tsukuba District
Dewa Province
18 villages in Murayama District
Mutsu Province (Iwaki Province)
10 villages in Ishikawa District
Mutsu Province (Iwashiro Province)
2villages in Iwase District
Shimōsa Province
6 villages in Soma District
Izumi Province
11 villages in Hine District
Mimasaka Province
3 villages in Yoshino District
16 villages in Shoboku District

List of daimyōs

References

External links
 Tsuchiura on "Edo 300 HTML"

Notes

Domains of Japan
1871 disestablishments in Japan
States and territories disestablished in 1871
Hitachi Province
History of Ibaraki Prefecture
Fujii-Matsudaira clan
Kutsuki clan
Nishio clan
Ōkōchi-Matsudaira clan